Chiral magnetic effect (CME) is the generation of electric current along an external magnetic field induced by chirality imbalance. Fermions are said to be chiral if they keep a definite projection of spin quantum number on momentum. The CME is a macroscopic quantum phenomenon present in systems with charged chiral fermions, such as the quark–gluon plasma, or Dirac and Weyl semimetals. The CME is a consequence of chiral anomaly in quantum field theory; unlike conventional superconductivity or superfluidity, it does not require a spontaneous symmetry breaking. The chiral magnetic current is non-dissipative, because it is topologically protected: the imbalance between the densities of left-handed and right-handed chiral fermions is linked to the topology of fields in gauge theory by the Atiyah-Singer index theorem.

The experimental observation of CME in a Dirac semimetal ZrTe5 was reported in 2014 by a group from Brookhaven National Laboratory and Stony Brook University. The material showed a conductivity increase in the Lorentz force-free configuration of the parallel magnetic and electric fields.

In 2015, the STAR detector at Relativistic Heavy Ion Collider, Brookhaven National Laboratory and ALICE: A Large Ion Collider Experiment at the Large Hadron Collider, CERN presented an experimental evidence for the existence of CME in the quark–gluon plasma.

See also
 Euler–Heisenberg Lagrangian
 Chiral anomaly

References

Electricity
Condensed matter physics